This is a complete list of members of the United States House of Representatives during the 2nd United States Congress listed by seniority. For the most part, representatives are ranked by the beginning of their terms in office.

As an historical article, the districts and party affiliations listed reflect those during the 2nd Congress (March 4, 1791 – March 3, 1793). Seats and party affiliations on similar lists for other Congresses will be different for certain members.

This article describes the criteria for seniority in the House of Representatives and sets out the list of members by seniority. It is prepared on the basis of the interpretation of seniority applied to the House of Representatives in the current congress. In the absence of information to the contrary, it is presumed that the twenty-first-century practice is identical to the seniority customs used during the 2nd Congress.

House seniority
Seniority in the House, for Congressmen with unbroken service, depends on the date on which the members first term began. That date is either the start of the Congress (4 March in odd numbered years, for the era up to and including the 73rd Congress starting in 1933) or the date of a special election during the Congress. Since many members start serving on the same day as others, ranking between them is based on alphabetical order by the last name of the congressman.

Congressmen, in early Congresses, were often elected after the legal start of the Congress. Such representatives are attributed with unbroken seniority, from the legal start of the congressional term, if they were the first person elected to a seat in a Congress. The date of the election is indicated in a note.

The seniority date is normally taken from the members entry in the Biographical Directory of the United States Congress, except where the date given is the legal start of the Congress and the actual election (for someone who was not the first person elected to the seat in that Congress) was later. The date of election is taken from United States Congressional Elections 1788-1997. In a few instances the latter work provides dates, for the start and end of terms, which correct those in the Biographical Directory.

The Biographical Directory normally uses the date of a special election, as the seniority date.  However, mostly in early Congresses, the date of the member taking his seat can be the one given. The date of the special election is mentioned in a note to the list below, when that date is not used as the seniority date by the Biographical Directory.

Representatives who return to the House, after having previously served, are credited with service equal to one less than the total number of terms they served. When a representative has served a prior term of less than two terms (i.e., prior term minus one equals less than one), he is ranked above all others whose service begins on the same day.

Leadership
In this Congress the only formal leader was the Speaker of the House. A Speakership ballot was held on October 24, 1791, and Jonathan Trumbull, Jr. (P-CT) was elected.

Standing committees
The House created its first standing committee, on April 13, 1789. There was one standing committees in the 2nd Congress.

Committees, in this period, were appointed for a session at a time and not necessarily for every one in a Congress. The Speaker appointed the members.

This list refers to the standing committee of the House in the 2nd Congress, the year of establishment as a standing committee, the number of members assigned to the committee and the dates of appointment in each session, the end of the session and its chairman.

List of representatives by seniority
A numerical rank is assigned to each of the 65 members initially elected to the 2nd Congress. Other members, who were not the first person elected to a seat but who joined the House during the Congress, are not assigned a number (apart from the Representatives from the two states, admitted during the Congress, who are numbered 66–70). 
Three Representatives-elect was not sworn in, as one died and two declined to serve. The list below includes the Representative-elect (with names in italics), with the seniority they would have held if they had been sworn in.

Party designations used in this article are A for Anti-Administration members and P for Pro-Administration representatives.

{|class="wikitable"
|+U.S. House seniority'|- valign=bottom
!Rank!!Representative!!Party!!District!!Seniority date!!Notes
|- 
|colspan="6"| Two consecutive terms|-
|1||Fisher Ames|||P||||rowspan=35||| rowspan=2|
|-
|2||Abraham Baldwin|||A||
|-
|3||Egbert Benson|||P|||| Last term until 13th Congress.
|-
|4||Elias Boudinot|||P||NJ-al|| 
|-
|5||John Brown|||A|||| Term ended on district being admitted as the new state of KY: June 1, 1792
|-
|6||Thomas Fitzsimons|||P|||| Elected to this Congress: October 11, 1791
|-
|7||Elbridge Gerry|||A|||| Last term.
|-
|8||Nicholas Gilman|||P||NH-al|| rowspan=2|
|-
|9||Benjamin Goodhue|||P||
|-
|10||Samuel Griffin|||A|||| Pro-Administration 1789-91
|-
|11||Thomas Hartley|||P||||rowspan=2| Elected to this Congress: October 11, 1791
|-
|12||Daniel Hiester|||A||
|-
|13||Daniel Huger|||P||||rowspan=3| Last term.
|-
|14||John Laurance|||P||
|-
|15||Richard B. Lee|||P||
|-
|16||George Leonard|||P|||| Elected to this Congress on April 2, 1792.  Last term until 4th Congress.
|-
|17||Samuel Livermore|||P||NH-al|| Anti-Administration 1789–91. Chairman: Elections. Last term.
|-
|18||James Madison|||A|||| rowspan=2|
|-
|19||Andrew Moore|||A||
|-
|20||Frederick Muhlenberg|||A|||| Elected to this Congress: October 11, 1791. Pro-Administration 1789–91.
|-
|21||John Page|||A||||rowspan=3| 
|-
|22||Josiah Parker|||A||
|-
|23||Theodore Sedgwick|||P||
|-
|24||Joshua Seney|||A|||| Resigned on December 6, 1792.
|-
|25||Roger Sherman|||P||CT-al|| Resigned, as Representative-elect, before taking his seat as a US Senator on June 13, 1791  
|-
|26||Peter Silvester|||P|||| Last term.
|-
|27||William L. Smith|||P|||| 
|-
|28||Jonathan Sturges|||P||CT-al|| Last term(elected to 3rd Congress but declined to serve)
|-
|29||Thomas Sumter|||A|||| Last term until 5th Congress.
|-
|30||George Thatcher|||P|||| Elected for this Congress: April 4, 1791  
|-
|31||Jonathan Trumbull, Jr.|||P||CT-al|| Speaker of the House
|-
|32||Thomas T. Tucker|||A||||rowspan=2| Last term.
|-
|33||John M. Vining|||P||DE-al
|-
|...||Jeremiah Wadsworth|||P||CT-al|| Re-elected by special election before the start of this Congress  
|-
|34||Alexander White|||P||||rowspan=4| Last term.
|-
|35||Hugh Williamson|||A||||
|-
|36||John B. Ashe|||A||||
|-
|37||John Steele|||P||||
|-
|38||William B. Giles|||A|||||| rowspan=2|
|- 
|39||Benjamin Bourne|||P||RI-al||
|-
|colspan="6"| One term|-
|40||Robert Barnwell|||P||||rowspan=26||| Only term (elected to 4th Congress but declined to serve)
|-
|41||Shearjashub Bourne|||P|||| rowspan=3|
|-
|42||Abraham Clark|||P||NJ-al
|-
|43||Jonathan Dayton|||P||NJ-al
|-
|44||Pierpont Edwards|||-||CT-al|| Declined to serve, as Representative-elect: November 10, 1790  
|-
|45||William Findley|||A|||| Elected to this Congress: October 11, 1791
|-
|46||James Gordon|||P|||| 
|-
|47||Andrew Gregg|||A|||| Elected to this Congress: October 11, 1791
|-
|48||William B. Grove|||P|||| rowspan=2|
|-
|49||James Hillhouse|||P||CT-al
|-
|50||Israel Jacobs|||P|||| Elected to this Congress: October 11, 1791. Only term.
|-
|51||Philip Key|||P|||| Only term.
|-
|52||Aaron Kitchell|||P||NJ-al|| Only term until seated in the 3rd Congress.
|-
|53||John W. Kittera|||P|||| Elected to this Congress: October 11, 1791
|-
|54||Nathaniel Macon|||A|||| rowspan=2|
|-
|55||William V. Murray|||P||
|-
|56||William Pinkney|||P|||| Resigned in November 1791. Only term until 14th Congress.
|- 
|57||Cornelius C. Schoonmaker|||A||||rowspan=2| Only term.
|-
|58||Upton Sheredine|||A||
|-
|59||Jeremiah Smith|||P||NH-al|| 
|-
|60||Samuel Sterett|||A|||| Only term.
|-
|61||James Townsend|||-|||| Died, as Representative-elect: May 24, 1790  
|-
|62||Abraham B. Venable|||A|||| rowspan=2| 
|-
|63||Artemas Ward|||P||
|-
|64||Anthony Wayne|||A|||| Seat declared vacant on March 21, 1792. Only term.
|-
|65||Francis Willis|||A|||| Only term.
|-
|colspan="6"| Members joining the House, after the start of the Congress|-
|...||Amasa Learned|||P||CT-al|||| Special election  
|-
|66||Nathaniel Niles|||A||||rowspan=2|||rowspan=2| Representative from a new state
|-
|67||Israel Smith|||A||
|-
|...||Thomas Tredwell|||A|||||| Special election April 26–28, 1791  
|-
|...||John F. Mercer|||A|||||| Special election
|-
|68||Alexander D. Orr|||A||||||rowspan=2| Representative from a new state
|-
|69||Christopher Greenup|||A||||
|-
|...||John Milledge|||A|||||| Special election. Only term until 4th Congress.
|-
|...||William Hindman|||P|||||| Special election
|-
|}

See also
2nd United States Congress
List of United States congressional districts
List of United States senators in the 2nd Congress by seniority

References

 United States Congressional Elections 1788-1997'', by Michael J. Dubin (McFarland and Company 1998)

External links
House Journal, First Forty-three Sessions of Congress
House of Representatives list of members of the 2nd Congress

2
2nd United States Congress